ImprovBoston is a nonprofit improvisational theater, based in Cambridge, Massachusetts. It offers shows and classes its theater in Central Square. Classes are offered in improvisation, stand-up comedy, musical improv, and sketch writing.

History

Founding 1982–1993 
In 1982, Ellen Holbrook, a former student at The Second City in Chicago and a producer of the Chicago Improv Olympic, moved to Boston with the idea to found an improvisational comedy troupe similar to Second City. Holbrook had the encouragement of former members of The Proposition, an earlier improv-comedy troupe, and Director David Shepherd, the founder of the Compass Players and the Improv Olympic.  In the beginning, she assembled and trained several loosely knit bands of improvisers into teams that competed in the Boston "Improv Olympic" at Reilly's Beef and Pub near Government Center.  Holbrook also arranged for David Shepherd and Second City's Michael Gellman to come to Boston to teach improv workshops to local performers. In 1983, Holbrook, along with Nicholas Emanuel and Katy Bolger, co-founded ImprovBoston, as the organization evolved. With their contacts, the group moved to Satch's near Copley Square, owned by former Boston Celtic Satch Sanders.   In 1984, ImprovBoston officially became a not-for-profit corporation and moved to Ryles Jazz Club in Cambridge at Inman Square, where they remained for several years. Show formats varied but often included several improv games based on audience suggestions, set sketches based on improvs from past shows, musical improvs and song parodies. ImprovBoston troupe members often took turns directing shows, but other ImprovBoston directors during this time included David Thibodeaux, Jack O'Connor, Leslie Curtin and Brad Jones.

1993–2000 
In 1993, under the leadership of Artistic Director Nancy Howland Walker, ImprovBoston acquired a lease to the Back Alley Theater in Inman Square - ImprovBoston's first dedicated theatre space.  The ImprovBoston Mainstage cast performed late night weekend shows for several years, eventually expanding to prime time slots. Walker was just as instrumental in obtaining the New England franchise of Theatersports, which eventually became a regular Thursday night show at the theater. During Walker's tenure, the cast grew from five to well over 20 members. Larry Pizza became Artistic Director in 1995 and, in 1997, the artistic leadership again transferred, this time to Ron Jones, a former cast member from the early 1990s. It was under Jones' leadership that the theater began to extend its reach to further aspects of improvisation, creating new formats and shows beyond the traditional shortform game format the theater used for their Friday and Saturday night shows.

2000-2008 
In 2000, former cast member Will Luera returned to ImprovBoston as the new Artistic Director, bringing with him several show concepts and forms he had established under the banner of Bluescreen Productions (a different improv theater he had established in Davis Square). This merger saw a third cast added to the ImprovBoston line-up, as ImprovBoston was granted the rights to Keith Johnstone's Micetro format. The theater's cast was again expanded in 2005 when the ensemble "Wrong Kind of Funny" was brought into what eventually formed IB's Family Show. In February 2008, ImprovBoston moved to a new venue in Cambridge's Central Square.

Luera was responsible for the theater's most aggressive expansion, with several new shows, concepts, and formats established; and for keeping the theater doors open on five nights each week. The Hump on Wednesday nights (improv fringe), The Great and Secret Comedy Show late Thursdays (stand-up comedy hosted by the Walsh Brothers), bi-monthly Showcase Shows in the early Friday night slot (newly created and designed improv shows in various genres or formats), and the Sgt. Culpepper Improvisational Jamboree on Sunday nights (two short shows featuring independent and college troupes from around the area, followed by an audience-participation "Open Jam").

ImprovBoston also established new annual productions including GoreFest (a scripted horror musical every October that involves copious amounts of fake blood and special effects), The ImprovBoston Holiday Spectacular (a holiday-themed sketch show), the Comedy Beanpot (an improv tournament hosted by ImprovBoston that involves college troupes from around the New England area).

In the past, ImprovBoston has also hosted The, Geekweek, Comedy Beanpot (now College Comedy Festival)

In 2010, the theater created an audio department with the intention of producing weekly free podcasts among other audio-only endeavors under the banner of "ImprovBoston Radio". This resulted in the flagship, and also Fireside Improv, a more instruction-oriented look at the comedic form with a panel of improv pupil, professor and philosopher.

2020 to Now 

In 2020, like many other art spaces, the theater had to close its doors and go dark for many months due to the COVID-19 pandemic. A small team returned in 2021 to revive the theater and bring it back to the post-pandemic Boston Comedy scene. Though without its home theater, the theater continued to host classes in improv, stand up, and sketch writing, weekly, as well as perform on the road in local theaters and performance spaces around Boston. In 2023, ImprovBoston rebranded its brand, updated its website, and renovated an office space to be a new black box theater space. The business is currently changing and building up from the 2020 shutdowns and becoming, once again, one of Boston's finest comedy theaters.

Notable alumni
 Adam Felber (Real Time with Bill Maher, Wait Wait... Don't Tell Me!)
 Amy Rhodes (Bad Judge, Funny or Die, The Ellen DeGeneres Show)
 Cameron Esposito (Take My Wife, Comedy Bang! Bang!, Drunk History, Chelsea Lately, Adventure Time)
 Christopher Nowinski
 Faith Soloway (Transparent)
 Jen Kirkman (Drunk History, @midnight, Chelsea Lately, Community)
 Jenny Zigrino (Funniest Wins)
 Jessimae Peluso
 Josh Gondelman (Last Week Tonight with John Oliver, Esquire, New York Magazine'')
 Katie Nolan
 Kelly MacFarland (Last Comic Standing, Comedy Central's Premium Blend, Larry King Live, Today)
 Lou Wilson (The Guest Book, American Vandal)
 Matt Donaher (Conan)
 Natalie Baseman (Comedy Bang! Bang!)
 Zabeth Russell (Jimmy Kimmel Live!, Jane The Virgin'', Breaking The Mold)

References

External links 
 

Improvisational theatre
Cambridge, Massachusetts
Tourist attractions in Cambridge, Massachusetts
Theatre in Massachusetts